Manoba melancholica is a moth in the  family Nolidae. It was described by Wileman and West in 1928. It is found in Japan.

References

Natural History Museum Lepidoptera generic names catalog

Moths described in 1928
Nolinae